This is a list of episodes for The Daily Show, a late-night talk and satirical news television program airing on Comedy Central, during 2023. This year marks the first since the departure of host Trevor Noah, who took his leave from the show after 7 years on December 8, 2022.

With no successor for Noah in place, Comedy Central indicated in December 2022 that a series of guests hosts will fill the anchor chair, each sitting in for a one-week assignment, until a permanent host(s) takes over. Leslie Jones will be the first guest host the week of January 17–19, with Wanda Sykes, D. L. Hughley, Chelsea Handler, and Sarah Silverman confirmed for subsequent weeks. Al Franken, John Leguizamo, Marlon Wayans, Kal Penn, and Hasan Minhaj will also serve as guest hosts in February and March.

2023 episodes

January

February

March

References

 
Daily Show guests
Daily Show guests